The Orchid is an Edwardian musical comedy in two acts with music by Ivan Caryll and Lionel Monckton, a book by James T. Tanner, lyrics by Adrian Ross and Percy Greenbank, and additional numbers by Paul Rubens. The story concerns marital mix-ups and the quest of a wealthy man for a $2,000 Peruvian orchid to be sent to France. When foul play keeps the flower from reaching its destination, it is discovered that a nearly identical orchid is growing in the garden of the horticultural college.

The musical opened on 26 October 1903 at London's Gaiety Theatre and ran for 559 performances. It starred Gertie Millar, Gabrielle Ray, Harry Grattan, Edmund Payne and George Grossmith, Jr. The show also had a successful Broadway run, revivals and a U.S. tour.

The Orchid was the first show produced at the renovated Gaiety Theatre. King Edward VII and Queen Alexandra both attended the opening night. Some of the show's most successful songs were "Liza Ann", "Little Mary", "Pushful" and "Fancy Dress".

Synopsis
Guy Scrymgeour is in love with Josephine Zaccary, but their union is opposed by his uncle, the rich and influential Mr. Chesterton, because she is the daughter of a mere orchid hunter. Meanwhile, a penniless young physician, Ronald Fausset, loves Lady Violet Anstruther. The two couples wed secretly, but the Registrar switches the names on the marriage certificates, so that Guy is joined to Lady Violet, and Ronald to Josephine.

Chesterton founds a horticultural college and sends Zaccary (Josephine's father) to Peru to seek a special $2,000 orchid, the orchid of his dreams. Zaccary is supposed to take the flower to Nice, France, for a competitive exhibition. However, Zaccary is unreliable and goes to Paris instead, in search of flowers of the human variety. Fortunately, it is discovered that Meakin, the gardener at the horticultural college, is growing a nearly identical orchid.

Roles and original cast

Lady Violet Anstruther (principal pupil at the horticultural college) – Gertie Millar
Caroline Twining (of a matrimonial turn) – Connie Ediss  
Zelie Rumbert (an adventuress) – Hilda Jacobsen  
Thisbe (private secretary to Mr. Chesterton) – Gabrielle Ray
Countess Anstruther (Violet's mother) – Phyllis Blair
Billy (Dr. Fausset's "Buttons") – Lydia West  
Lady Warden (of the horticultural college) – Gertrude Aylward  
Josephine Zaccary (pupil teacher at the horticultural college) – Ethel Sydney  
The Hon. Guy Scrymgeour (Mr. Chesterton's nephew) – George Grossmith, Jr.
Dr. Ronald Fausset (a country practitioner) – Lionel Mackinder  
Mr. Aubrey Chesterton (Minister of Commerce, and Guy's uncle) – Harry Grattan
Comte Raoul De Cassignat (of the Quai d'Orsay) – Robert Nainby
Zaccary (a professional orchid hunter) – Fred Wright, junr.
M. Frontenbras, M. Merignac (Comte Raoul's seconds) – George Gregory and Charles A. Brown  
Registrar – Arthur Hatherton  
Master Of Ceremonies – Will Bishop  
M. D'auville (French minister of state) – H. Lewis  
Meakin (gardener at the horticultural college) – Edmund Payne
Debutantes

Musical numbers

Act I – The Countess of Barwick's Horticultural College
No. 1. Chorus – "This high horticultural college is formed with the excellent plan" 
No. 2. Thisbe & Chorus – "A statesman in the Cabinet wants plenty of assistance" 
No. 3. Jo & Chorus – "If I could be a girl in high society, whose pedigree included a peer or two" 
No. 4. Meakin & Chorus – "You amateurs who try to run a garden" 
No. 5. Jo, Lady Violet, Guy, Ronald & Meakin – "For a stylish and up-to-date wedding" 
No. 6. Débutantes – "Come! come! come! Come for confidential talks in the arbours and the walks" 
No. 7. Chesterton & Chorus – "From the start of my existence I was noted for persistence" 
No. 8. Lady Violet, Jo, Guy & Ronald – "Our marriage lines! our marriage lines! The magic in those simple signs" 
No. 9. Caroline & Meakin – "The cuckoo is calling aloud to his mate, the turtle dove coos in its nest" 
No. 10. Chorus – "Now the speechifying's done, and the prizes we have won have been given" 
No. 11. Zaccary & Chorus – "I've travelled far where panthers are that jump on you and catch you!" 
No. 12. Caroline & Chorus – "I was tired of living single, never putting up the banns" 
No. 13. Finale Act I – "What a most romantic history!  Solving all the recent mystery!  Violet has played the run-away"

Act II – Various locations in Nice: Black Massena, Promenade des Anglais, & Interior of the Opera House

No. 14. horus – "Up and down, over the town, motley and merriment speed along." 
No. 14a. Pas de Trois 
No. 15. Caroline & Chorus – "I've a passion for fancy dress, more or less!" 
No. 16. Lady Violet & Chorus – "There's a certain little lady who's already known to fame as Little Mary" 
No. 17. Guy & Meakin – "We're true British labourers honest and free, but, alas, we are both unemployed" 
No. 18. Zaccary & Chorus – "I'm monarch of many a million, especially put in francs" 
No. 19. Ronald & Jo – "I never was so thoroughly wretched and sad in all my life" 
No. 20. Lady Violet & Zaccary – "There's a Yorkshire town, very bleak and brown, where your life is not too gay" 
No. 21. Guy – "There's a charming little lady who's a patron of the play" 
No. 22. Jo – "I've been waiting for some sort of sign that you want this little heart of mine" 
No. 23. Chorus – "We are going to the Ball all in white" 
No. 24. Thisbe – "There's a girl I want you all to know, Rose-a-Rubie is her name" 
No. 25. Octet – "Oh dear! have you heard of it? There's a ball we ought to see" 
No. 26. Chorus – Bal Blanc – "Carnival is nearly ended, now we drop our colours splendid" 
No. 27. Jo & Guy, with Chorus – "When I go to a ball, although I'm the keenest of the dancers" 
No. 28. Lady Violet & Chorus – "When I was extremely small, only three or four" 
No. 29. Ronald – "There are lots of fellows in the world today, but ther're very few about like me" 
No. 30. Finale Act II – "At the fancy, fancy ball, happiness has come to all"

References

External links
Vocal score
Information about the Broadway production
Information about the show's US touring schedule
List of longest running plays in London and New York

1903 musicals
West End musicals
Original musicals
British musicals